HLV may refer to:
 Heavy-lift launch vehicle
 High-level verification
 H-L-V School District, in Iowa, United States
 Holland Village MRT station (MRT station abbreviation), Singapore
 Venezuelan Standard Time (Spanish: , "Venezuela's Legal Time")